is a former Japanese football player.

Club career
Ikenoue was born in Gunma Prefecture on February 16, 1967. After graduating from Osaka University of Commerce, he joined Matsushita Electric in 1989. He played many matches as offensive midfielder. In 1990, he moved to All Nippon Airways (later Yokohama Flügels). However he did not play as much in 1993. In 1994, he moved to Japan Football League club PJM Futures (later Tosu Futures). He retired at the end of the 1995 season.

National team career
In 1988, when Ikenoue was an Osaka University of Commerce student, he was selected for the Japan national "B team" for the 1988 Asian Cup. At that competition, he played two games. However, the Japan Football Association does not count that as a Japan national team match because he played for the "B team," and not the "top team."

Club statistics

References

External links

1967 births
Living people
Osaka University of Commerce alumni
Association football people from Gunma Prefecture
Japanese footballers
Japan　Soccer　League players
J1 League players
Japan Football League (1992–1998) players
Gamba Osaka players
Yokohama Flügels players
Sagan Tosu players
1988 AFC Asian Cup players
Association football midfielders